Alternanthera ficoidea, also known as Joseph's coat, Parrot leaf, is a species of flowering plant in the family Amaranthaceae. It is native to the Caribbean and South America and occurs elsewhere in the tropics as an introduced species. It is considered invasive in Palau, the Philippines and Australia (Queensland). Propagation occurs via seeds.

References

ficoidea
Plants described in 1819
Flora of the Caribbean
Flora of Panama
Flora of Brazil
Flora of French Guiana
Flora of Guyana
Flora of Suriname
Flora of Venezuela
Flora of Colombia
Flora of Paraguay
Flora without expected TNC conservation status